K-4 is a nuclear capable Intermediate-range submarine-launched ballistic missile developed by the Defence Research and Development Organisation of India to arm the Arihant-class submarines. The missile has a maximum range of about 4000 km.

Development

The development of the K-4 was undertaken after facing significant difficulties in compacting similarly capable Agni-III to equip INS Arihant which has a limited  diameter hull. The gas-booster designed for K-4 was successfully tested from a submerged pontoon in 2010.

Agencies responsible 
The High Energy Material Research Laboratory (HEMRL) and the Advanced Centre for Energetic Materials (ACEM) of the DRDO have been involved in developing the three motors responsible for propelling the K-4, the systems responsible for separating the stages of K-4, the low-thrust boosters, the gas generator and other components. The launch system of K-4 has been developed by the Naval Systems Group of the Research and Development Establishment (Engineers).

Description

The K-4 is a submarine-launched ballistic missile which is composed of two stages. The DRDO stated that the aim of the missile was to achieve a high accuracy. As a countermeasure against ballistic missile defence systems, the K4 can perform three-dimensional maneuvers.

Testing
The developmental testing of K-4 started in January 2010, when the missile successfully ejected from a pontoon submerged 50 metres below the surface of water and breached the surface. The missile was originally scheduled to be initially tested in September 2013 from a pontoon submerged 50 feet underwater, but the test was delayed due to unspecified issues. In the event, the first test was carried out on 24 March 2014 from a depth of 30 metres. The test was successful and the missile was tested to a range of 3,000 km.  The launch took place from a pontoon submerged more than 30 metres deep in the sea off the Visakhapatnam coast. After a powerful gas generator ejected it from the pontoon submerged in the Bay of Bengal, the K-4 missile rose into the air, took a turn towards the designated target, sped across 3,000 km in the sky and dropped into the Indian Ocean.

It is reported that on 7 March 2016 the K-4 was successfully tested from a submerged platform in the Bay of Bengal.

In April 2016, it was reported that the missile was successfully tested on 31 March 2016 from INS Arihant, 45 nautical miles away from Vishakhapatnam coast in Andhra Pradesh. The missile with a dummy payload was launched from the submarine in full operational configuration. The trial was carried out with the support of the personnel of Strategic Forces Command (SFC) and the DRDO provided all the logistics. The missile was fired from 20-metre deep and covered more than 700 km before zeroing on the target with high accuracy reaching close to zero error.

On 17 December 2017, an attempt to launch K-4 missile ended in a failure. The failure was attributed to a discharged battery.

A test of the K-4 was planned in October 2019 but got postponed. A test of the K-4 missile was expected to be held on 8 November 2019, but got postponed due to unfavorable weather conditions caused by the cyclone Bulbul. A test of the missile was expected to be conducted in December 2019.

On 19 January 2020, K-4 was successfully tested from a submerged platform located in the coastal waters of Andhra Pradesh. This test was undertaken in full operational configuration during which the missile traversed a distance of over 3,500 km in approximately 21 minutes, achieving a near-zero circular error probability.

Another test was successfully carried out on 24 January 2020. This was the final developmental test of K-4 and the missile was ready to enter serial production.

See also

K Missile family
Arihant class submarine
Sagarika (missile)

References 

Submarine-launched ballistic missiles
Defence Research and Development Organisation
Ballistic missiles of India